The Necropolis for the victims of Fascism (Bosnian/Serbian/Croatian: Nekropola žrtvama fašizma) is located in Novi Travnik, Bosnia and Herzegovina. It was opened in 1975 to commemorate around 700 victims executed at this site during the Second World War, and designed by the architect Bogdan Bogdanović. The monument is located in farmland on a hilltop named Čamića Brdo, just off the main road between Vitez and Travnik. The site was inscribed as a National Monument of Bosnia and Herzegovina in 2012  in the Cultural Landscape category.

Description 
The monument consists of twelve megalithic compositions chiseled from Bihacite  stone within a complex of paths and steps. 
The megaliths have been described  variously as ‘stone dragon sentinels’, ‘paired snakes’, ‘heads of soldiers’, and “large stones engraved with strange primitive symbols that recall those of the Bogomils” 
. They are placed on stone plinths, and set in two irregular arcs, in pairs, with the distance between each pair measuring approximately 2–3 metres.

History 
Although the memorial site originally occupied a 2 square kilometer patch of land, encroaching farmland has now reduced the memorial area to less than 200 square metres, and a small flight of steps approximately 40 metres long. These steps and the flagstoned area at their base are no longer maintained. 
The area around Novi Travnik saw some of the heaviest fighting of the 1992-95 war. As well as the presence of landmines in the vicinity until recently, leading to a general neglect of the area, one megalith is badly damaged, being overturned and broken. A further sculpture appears to be almost completely absent. Several of the megaliths bear bullet impacts, particularly on the eastern-facing side. One word has been intentionally erased from the commemorative stone at the site's entrance.  This word almost definitely referred to Ustaše forces.
No conservation or restoration works have been carried out on the monument since its 1975 opening.
A ceremonial wreath laying is undertaken at the monument every 9 May.

See also 
Vraca Memorial Park is located in Sarajevo, Bosnia and Herzegovina.
Partisan cemetery in Livno is located in Livno, Bosnia and Herzegovina.
Partisan Memorial Cemetery in Mostar is located in Mostar, Bosnia and Herzegovina (also designed by Bogdan Bogdanović).

References 

Central Bosnia Canton
Cemeteries in Bosnia and Herzegovina
World War II cemeteries
Monuments and memorials in Bosnia and Herzegovina
National Monuments of Bosnia and Herzegovina
1975 establishments in Bosnia and Herzegovina
Yugoslav World War II monuments and memorials
Necropoleis